Brunswick Books (formerly Fernwood Books) is a Canadian academic publishing company, founded in 1978 and headquartered in Toronto. It is primarily a book marketing and sales company for Canadian universities. It describes its aim as "to provide progressive books from progressive publishers to progressive people."

The company markets and sells books on behalf of
Between the Lines
Charivari Press
Demeter Press
Fernwood Publishing
Inanna Publications
JCharlton Publishing
Merlin Press
Monthly Review Press
Pambazuka Press
Purich Publishing
Pluto Books
Roseway Publishing
Red Quill Books
Arbeiter Ring Publishing
Cape Breton University Press
Waves of the Future
Zed Books
Brush Education Inc.
University of Regina Press

References

External links
Brunswick Books

Book publishing companies of Canada
Publishing companies established in 1978
Academic publishing companies